Sulak is the name of several inhabited localities in Russia.

Urban localities
Sulak, Republic of Dagestan, an urban-type settlement under the administrative jurisdiction of Kirovsky City District of the City of Makhachkala in the Republic of Dagestan; 

Rural localities
Sulak, Penza Oblast, a selo in Volchkovsky Selsoviet of Belinsky District in Penza Oblast
Sulak, Saratov Oblast, a selo in Krasnopartizansky District of Saratov Oblast
Sulak, Tambov Oblast, a selo in Sulaksky Selsoviet of Umyotsky District in Tambov Oblast